Birinci Yeddioymaq (also, Yeddioymaq, Yeddioymak Pervoye, and Yeddy-Oymag Pervoye) is a village and municipality in the Masally Rayon of Azerbaijan.  It has a population of 1,736.

References 

Populated places in Masally District